Russell Mark Fulcher (born March 9, 1962) is an American businessman and politician serving as the U.S. representative for Idaho's 1st congressional district since 2019. A member of the Republican Party, he represented the 21st district in the Idaho Senate from 2005 to 2012 and the 22nd district from 2012 until 2014.

Fulcher ran for governor of Idaho in 2014 but narrowly lost the nomination to Butch Otter. He was elected to the U.S. House of Representatives in 2018, succeeding incumbent Raúl Labrador, who retired from Congress to run, unsuccessfully, for governor of Idaho.

Early life and education
A fourth-generation Idahoan, Fulcher was born in Boise, Idaho, but grew up on a dairy farm in Meridian, Idaho. He received both a bachelor's and master's degree in business administration from Boise State University in 1984 and 1988, respectively. He also completed a course on electronic engineering through Micron Technology.

Career 
While a member of the Idaho legislature, Fulcher worked as a broker in the commercial real estate business. Before that, he was involved in Idaho's technology industry. Fulcher spent much of that time working in international business development with Micron Technology.

Idaho Senate

Idaho Senate District 21

In 2005, Governor Dirk Kempthorne appointed Fulcher to the Idaho State Senate, representing the 21st legislative district, which encompasses large parts of Boise, Meridian and Kuna, to replace Jack Noble, who resigned after a conflict of interest. Fulcher was first elected in 2006 and served through 2012.

Idaho Senate District 22

Fulcher represented District 22 in the Idaho Senate from 2012 to 2014. He served as Majority Caucus Leader from 2008 to 2012 and from 2013 to 2014.

Committees
Fulcher served on the following committees:

 Senate Education Committee (Member)
 Senate State Affairs Committee (Vice-chairman)

U.S. House of Representatives

Elections

2018 

On June 15, 2017, Fulcher announced that he would seek the Republican nomination for Idaho's 1st congressional district in the 2018 election.

He was endorsed by the incumbent representative, Raúl Labrador, and Texas Senator Ted Cruz.

Fulcher won the Idaho Republican Party primary with 43.1% of the vote, defeating David H. Leroy, Luke Malek, Christy Perry, Michael Snyder, Alex Gallegos, and Nick Henderson. Fulcher won 18 of 19 counties in Idaho's 1st congressional district. He was one of two candidates to win his home county.

He won the general election in November with 62.7% of the vote, defeating Cristina McNeil (Democrat), W. Scott Howard (Libertarian), and Marvin "Pro-Life" Richardson (Constitution).

2020 

Fulcher was reelected on November 3, 2020, with 67.8% of the vote, defeating Rudy Soto (Democrat) and Joe Evans (Libertarian).

Tenure
In December 2020, Fulcher was one of 126 Republican members of the House of Representatives to sign an amicus brief in support of Texas v. Pennsylvania, a lawsuit filed at the United States Supreme Court contesting the results of the 2020 presidential election, in which Joe Biden defeated incumbent Donald Trump. The Supreme Court declined to hear the case on the basis that Texas lacked standing under Article III of the Constitution to challenge the results of an election held by another state.

On January 12, 2021, Fulcher allegedly assaulted a female Capitol security officer after setting off a metal detector outside the House floor, triggering an investigation by the U.S. Capitol Police.

Big Tech
In 2022, Fulcher was one of 39 Republicans to vote for the Merger Filing Fee Modernization Act of 2022, an antitrust package that would crack down on corporations for anti-competitive behavior.

Committee assignments 
Committee on Natural Resources
Subcommittee on National Parks, Forests and Public Lands (Ranking Member)
Subcommittee on Water, Oceans and Wildlife
Committee on Education and Labor
Subcommittee on Civil Rights and Human Services (Ranking Member)
Subcommittee on Higher Education and Workforce Investment

Caucus memberships 
 Freedom Caucus
Republican Study Committee

Electoral history

Other political campaigns

2014 gubernatorial race

On November 23, 2013, Fulcher announced his intention to run against incumbent governor Butch Otter in the 2014 Idaho gubernatorial election. He was endorsed by Congressman Raúl Labrador.

Fulcher lost to Otter in the May 2014 Republican primary, earning 43.6% of the vote.

2016 presidential election

Fulcher was a Ted Cruz delegate at the 2016 Republican National Convention. He supported Donald Trump in the general election.

2018 gubernatorial race

Fulcher announced on August 24, 2016, that he was running for governor.

On June 15, 2017, he announced that he was dropping out of the 2018 Idaho gubernatorial election and would instead run for Idaho's 1st congressional district in the 2018 cycle.

Personal life 
Fulcher was married to Kara Fulcher from 1987 to 2018. They have three adult children.

References

External links

 Congressman Russ Fulcher official U.S. House website
Close partner Brandi Swindell
Russ Fulcher for Congress

Financial details at  OpenSecrets

|-

|-

|-

1963 births
Boise State University alumni
Republican Party Idaho state senators
Living people
People from Meridian, Idaho
Republican Party members of the United States House of Representatives from Idaho
21st-century American politicians